The Onizuka Prop Wash Award recognizes the student at the United States Air Force Test Pilot School (USAF TPS) who contributed most to class spirit and morale. The honoree from each class is selected by his or her fellow students rather than by school faculty. The award is named in memory of TPS graduate Ellison Onizuka who perished in the explosion of the Space Shuttle Challenger in 1986.

History
The Prop Wash Award was introduced at the USAF Test Pilot school in 1956. The award takes the form of a wooden aircraft propeller to which plaques bearing the name of each honoree are mounted. Prop wash refers to the spiral-shaped slipstream formed behind a rotating propeller on an aircraft. The phrase, Illegitimi non carborundum, a mock-Latin aphorism meaning "Don't let the bastards grind you down" is engraved on the face.

The first recipient of the award was Major Joseph W. Rogers from class 56D who would later set a world speed record in the Convair F-106 Delta Dart. Captain Onizuka was also a recipient when he graduated from the Test Pilot School with class 74B. After Onizuka's death, the members of his class requested a rededication of the award. The inscription was changed in June 1988 for the graduation of TPS class 87B.

The USAF Test Pilot School participates in an exchange program with other test communities. U.S. Navy and U.S. Marine Corps students from the Naval Test Pilot School at the Patuxent River Naval Air Station, Maryland attend the USAF TPS and vice versa. Foreign students may also attend and include those from the Empire Test Pilots' School at Boscombe Down, England, and the EPNER (École du Personnel Navigant d'Essais et de Réception), the French Test Pilots' School. All students at the USAF TPS are eligible to receive the Prop Wash Award.

Recipients
The following table contains an incomplete list of Onizuka Prop Wash award recipients including name, country (if not the United States of America), military branch (if not the United States Air Force), military rank at the time of the award, and USAF Test Pilot School class number. 

 Individual was killed in a work-related (aviation) accident.
 Multiple individuals shared the award.

See also

 List of aviation awards

References

External links

Aviation awards